Demoxepam is a drug which is a benzodiazepine derivative. It is a metabolite of chlordiazepoxide and has anticonvulsant properties and presumably other characteristic benzodiazepine properties.

See also
Benzodiazepine
Chlordiazepoxide

References

Benzodiazepines
Chloroarenes
GABAA receptor positive allosteric modulators
Lactams